Besantinus (Greek: Βησαντῖνος; Bēsantînos, 2nd century AD) was a Greek epigrammatist of the Roman period who flourished in Hadrian's era and was possibly from Rhodes.

Works 
The Vatican MS. of the Greek Anthology wrongly attributes to an author of this name two epigrams, of which one is also ascribed to Pallas, and the other is included among the epigrams of Theognis. This latter epigram is quoted by Stobaeus as of "Theognis or Besantinus".  

The "Egg" of Simmias bears the following title in the Vatican MS.: Βησαντίνου Ῥόδιου ὠὸν ἢ Δωσιάδα ὴ̂ Σιμμίου ἀμφότεροι λὰρ Ρόδιοι. Hence we may infer that Besantinus was a fellow Rhodian. 

An author of this name is repeatedly quoted in the Etymologicum Magnum, whom Fabricius rightly identifies with the Helladius Besantinus of Photius. 

The name is also spelt Bisantinus (Βισαντῖνος, Bisantînos).

The Altar 
Two manuscripts of the Bucolics of Theocritus attribute to Besantinus a βωμός (bōmós), a pattern poem in the shape of an altar: 26 verses in different metres forming the eulogising acrostic Ὀλύμπιε πολλοῖς ἔτεσι θυσείας ("Olympian, mayst thou sacrifice for many years"), that is certainly addressed to Hadrian.

See also 

 Altar poem
 Concrete poetry

References

Notes

Citations

Bibliography 
 Degani, Enzo (2006). "Besantinus". In Salazar, Christine F. (ed.). Brill’s New Pauly Online.
 Hopkinson, Neil (2015). "Besantinus: The Altar". Theocritus. Moschus. Bion. Loeb Classical Library 28. Cambridge, MA: Harvard University Press.
 Paton, W. R. (1916). The Greek Anthology V. Loeb Classical Library. London: William Heinemann; New York: G. P. Putnam's Sons.
 Smith, Philip (1867). "Besantinus". In Smith, William (ed.). Dictionary of Greek and Roman Biography and Mythology. 1. Boston: Little, Brown & Co.

External links 

 Bond, Sarah Emily (2016). "Using Graphic Language: A Short History of Figure Poems". History from Below. Retrieved 9 April 2022.

Epigrammatists of the Greek Anthology
People from Rhodes